Vimla Lodhia Patel  is a Fijian-born Canadian cognitive psychologist and biomedical informaticist.

Patel has worked in the area of biomedical informatics, in particular studying the mediating roles of technology on performance. Her work includes studies of medical errors and error reduction in emergency care and other critical medical environments, (including telephone triage). Her past work in health cognition includes studies of risk-taking behavior and sexual decision making as it pertains to HIV in youth and adolescents. Her current work focuses mostly on identifying underlying cognition in medical error and learning.

Biography and career

Patel was born in Fiji and obtained a degree in biochemistry and microbiology from University of Otago in New Zealand, and MA and PhD in Educational Psychology (Medical Cognition, 1980, 1981) from McGill University in Montreal, where she also served as professor of Medicine and Psychology and director of the Centre for Medical Education. She was a founding member of HEALnet (Health Evidence Application and Linkage Network), which made seminal contributions furthering informatics research and application in Canada. She was also a member of the InterMed Collaboratory, which developed guidelines for medical decision support, and has done extensive work in India, Africa, and Colombia in cross-cultural cognition research.

In 2000 she became director of the Laboratory of Cognition and Decision Making in the department of Biomedical Informatics at Columbia University, where she was also faculty in the department of Psychiatry and Teacher's College. From 2007 to 2009, she served as interim chair and vice chair of Department of BMI at Arizona State University. Patel was a professor of biomedical informatics and co-director of the Center for Cognitive Informatics and Decision Making at the University of Texas Health Science Center at Houston from 2009 to 2011. As of November 2011, Patel joined the New York Academy of Medicine as a senior research scientist and is the head of the Center for Cognitive Studies in Medicine and Public Health and is an adjunct professor of biomedical informatics at Columbia University in New York.

Research
In 1978 Elstein, Shulman and Sprafka applied cognitive science methods to investigate physicians’ clinical competence, developing a model of hypothetico-deductive reasoning which proposed that physicians reason by generating and testing a set of hypotheses to explain clinical data. This is an example of backward (hypothesis-to-data) reasoning. In 1986, Patel and Groen demonstrated that experts who accurately diagnosed complex clinical problems used forward reasoning (data to hypothesis), in contrast to novice subjects who used backward reasoning and misdiagnosed or partially diagnosed the same problems.

Patel also applied text comprehension methods to understanding the use of clinical practice guidelines with the goal of increasing adoption of best practices. Patel and colleagues have recently argued for new paradigm for error studies, where  instead of zero error tolerance, detection and correction of potential error is viewed as an integral part of cognitive work in a complex workplace.

She is the author of more than 300 publications in cognitive psychology, biomedical informatics, medical education and related fields.

Honors

 Member, Committee on Patient Safety and Health Information Technology, Institute of Medicine (IOM). 2010-2011.
 Science and Technology Research Award (STAR) with Edward Shortliffe, UTHealth, Houston,Texas. 2009
 Vice Chair, AMIA Program Committee. 2009
 Service Faculty of the Year Award, School of Computing and Informatics, Arizona State University. 2008
 Member, Clinical Research Review Committee, The National Center for Research Resources (NCRR). 2007-2009
 Selected for Marquis Who’s Who in the World. 2007
 Member, Committee on Opportunities in Basic Research in the Behavioral and the Social Sciences for the Military, National Research Council, U.S.A. 2006
 Elected Fellow, New York Academy of Medicine. 2004
 Vice President (Member Service), International Medical Informatics Association Governing Board. 2003-2006
 Outstanding Manuscript Award in Educational Methodology, Journal of Dental Education. 2002
 Member, Bio-engineering Training and Education Program, National Science Foundation, USA. 1999-2007
 Chair, Editorial Committee, Medinfo2001, International Medical Informatics Association, London, UK. 1999
 D.Sc. (honorary), University of Victoria, BC, Canada. 1998
 Member, Roundtable on Work, Learning and Assessment, National Research Council, U.S.A. 1997
 Elected Member, Board of Governors, Cognitive Science Society. 1997
 Elected Fellow, American College of Medical Informatics. 1996
 Fellow, The Royal Society of Canada (elected by the Academy of Humanities and Social Sciences). 1996
 Elected “Woman of Science” for the year (Sweden). 1994

Publications
 Journal Articles
 Book Chapters
 Medline Publications
 Google Scholar Citations

References

External links
 

Canadian psychologists
Year of birth missing (living people)
Living people
Fijian people of Indian descent
McGill University alumni
Academic staff of McGill University
University of Otago alumni
Arizona State University faculty
Columbia University faculty
Fijian emigrants to Canada
University of Texas Health Science Center at Houston faculty
Health informaticians
Canadian people of Indo-Fijian descent
Canadian women psychologists